Mirabilis elegans is a species of flowering plants. It is found in Chile and Peru.

References

External links 

 Mirabilis elegans at The Plant List
 Mirabilis elegans at Tropicos

elegans
Plants described in 1889
Flora of Chile
Flora of Peru
Taxa named by Jacques Denys Choisy